General Lucas may refer to:

Alfred Lucas (Indian Army officer) (1822–1896), British Indian Army general
Charles Lucas (1613–1648), English Army general
Cuthbert Lucas (1879–1958), British Army major general
John P. Lucas (1890–1949), U.S. Army major general
Robert Lucas (governor) (1781–1853), Ohio Militia brigadier general
Steve Lucas (born 1952), Canadian Air Force lieutenant general

See also
Attorney General Lucas (disambiguation)